The following list includes some of the most significant awards and nominations received by the English rock band Genesis. This does not include any awards or nominations received for solo works or other group activities.

Awards and nominations

See also
For Phil Collins’s solo career, see Awards and nominations received by Phil Collins.
For Peter Gabriel’s solo career, see Awards and nominations received by Peter Gabriel.
For Mike and the Mechanics, see Awards and nominations received by Mike and the Mechanics.

Notes

References

External links
 Genesis - Artist - grammy.com
 Tony Cousins - Artist - grammy.com
 Grammy Awards
  Music Awards History
 Brit Awards (Genesis)
 Brit Awards (Hugh Padgham)
 The Ivor Novello Awards
 MTV Video Music Awards History
 Rock and Roll Hall of Fame

Awards
Lists of awards received by British musician
Lists of awards received by musical group